Jennifer Sevilla-Go (born May 14, 1974) is a Filipino actress in movies and television shows. She was a former member of That's Entertainment.

Personal life
Jeniffer Sevilla was born on May 14, 1974 in Quezon City. She is an only child. She studied Communication Arts at the University of Santo Tomas in the Philippines. Sevilla took a break from showbiz when she married Seymour Go, a businessman, on November 11, 2007. Her first child is Simon Rafa.

Career
Sevilla started her Philippine showbiz career at age seven in a Jack 'n Jill snack food commercial in the early '80s. She starred in a movie, Kapitan Inggo (1984), that get her nominated as Best Child Actress for the Filipino Academy of Movie Arts and Sciences Awards (aka FAMAS Award). She became a mainstay of That's Entertainment, a youth-oriented TV variety show with fellow teen actors: Vina Morales, Keempee de Leon and Ian Veneracion.

During her teen years, she did more TV commercials for Colgate toothpaste and Newtex Napkins sanitary pads.

Sevilla an actress for Seiko Film Productions, Inc. and played the third wheel to the  Sheryl Cruz-Romnick Sarmenta loveteam movies. She starred in Puso Sa Puso (1988), Langit At Lupa (1989), and Guhit Ng Palad (1998).

She did Kung Ako Na Lang Sana (2003) with Sharon Cuneta and Aga Muhlach under Star Cinema. She also did a film for Gawad Kalinga Paraiso: Tatlong Kwento Ng Pag-asa (2007) with Maricel Soriano.

Awards and nominations
2000 Nominated FAMAS Award Best Supporting Actress Kahapon, May Dalawang Bata (1999)
2000 Nominated Gawad Urian Award Best Supporting Actress Kahapon, May Dalawang Bata (1999)
1999 Nominated FAMAS Award Best Supporting Actress Kay Tagal Kang Hinintay (1998)
1996 Nominated Gawad Urian Award Best Supporting Actress Muling Umawit Ang Puso (1995)
1985 Nominated FAMAS Award Best Child Actress Kapitan Inggo (1984)

Filmography

Film
Kapitan Inggo (1984)
Kaya Kong Abutin ang Langit (1984)
Nang Maghalo ang Balat sa Tinalupan (1984)
Miguel Cordero (1984)
Ina, Kasusuklaman Ba Kita? (1984)
Mga Kuwento ni Lola Basyang (1984)
Hindi Nahahati ang Langit (1985)
Huwag Mo Kaming Isumpa (1986)
Ayokong Tumungtong sa Lupa (1987)
Ako si Kiko, Ako si Kikay (1987)
Black Magic (1987)
Huwag Mong Buhayin ang Bangkay (1987)
Leroy Leroy Sinta (1988)
Puso sa Puso (1988)
Guhit ng Palad (1988)
Hindi Tao, Hindi Hayop: Adventures of Seiko Jewels (1988)
Mirror, Mirror on the Wall (1988)
Langit at Lupa (1988)
Pardina at ang Mga Duwende (1989)
Anak ng Demonyo (1989)
Kokak (1989)
First Lesson (1989)
Mundo Man Ay Magunaw (1990)
Naughty Boys (1990)
Alyas Baby Face (1990)
Zaldong Tisoy (1991)
Matud Nila (1991)
Tukso Layuan Mo Ako! (1991)
Mario Sandoval (1992)
Eh, Kasi Bata (1992)
Taong Gubat (1993)
Love Notes (1995)
Muling Umawit ang Puso (1995)
Bridesmaids (1997)
Ikaw Pala ang Mahal Ko (1997)
 Papunta Ka Pa Lang Pabalik na Ako (1997) Maricar
Kay Tagal Kang Hinintay (1998)
Kahapon, May Dalawang Bata (1999)
The Kite (1999)
Lagarista (2000)
Sugatang Puso (2001)
Till There Was You (2003)
Kung Ako Na Lang Sana (2003)
Ang Huling Araw ng Linggo (2006)
Super Noypi (2006)
Paraiso: Tatlong Kwento ng Pag-asa (2007)
Trespassers (2011)

Television 
That's Entertainment (GMA 7, 1988-1993)
Lovingly Yours (GMA 7, 1988-1996)
Young Love Sweet Love (RPN 9, 1988-1993)
Saturday Entertainment (GMA 7, 1988-1993)
Abangan ang Susunod na Kabanata - Jenny (1991-1997)
Reeling & Rockin (IBC 13, 1992)
Maalaala Mo Kaya - Limos (1993)
Love Notes (ABC 5, 1994)
Noli Me Tangere (ABC 5, 1995)
1896 (TV5, 1996)
Tierra Sangre (TV series) (1996)
Esperanza - Elaine (1999)
Maalaala Mo Kaya - Sugat (1998)
Saan Ka Man Naroroon (1999)
Sa Puso Ko Iingatan Ka (2001)
Recuerdo de Amor - Janice (2001)
Ikaw Lang ang Mamahalin (2001)
Magpakailanman (GMA 7, 2002-2004)
Te Amo, Maging Sino Ka Man (2004)
Saang Sulok ng Langit (2005)
Bakekang (2006)
Mga Kwento ni Lola Basyang - Ang Prinsipeng Mahaba Ang Ilong (2007)
Pati Ba Pintig Ng Puso (2007)
Maalaala Mo Kaya - Bracelet (2008)
Rosalinda (2009)
Hawak-Kamay (ABS-CBN 2, 2014)
Strawberry Lane (GMA 7, 2014)
Walang Tulugan with the Master Showman (GMA 7, 2016)
Love Thy Woman (ABS-CBN 2, 2020)
La Vida Lena (iWantTFC, 2020)
Ang Probinsyano (Kapamilya Channel, 2021)
Teen Clash (iWantTFC, 2023)

References

External links

Colgate, 1980s, Commercial, Isabel Granada, Chuckie Dreyfus, Jennifer Sevilla at www.youtube.com

Living people
Filipino child actresses
That's Entertainment Thursday Group Members
Filipino film actresses
Filipino television actresses 
People from Quezon City 
Actresses from Metro Manila 
1974 births
Filipino women comedians
That's Entertainment (Philippine TV series)
ABS-CBN personalities
University of Santo Tomas alumni